Revival from Below: The Deoband Movement and Global Islam a research book on Deoband movement by Brannon D. Ingram, Professor of Northwestern University. The book was published in 2016 by University of California Press. It is an account of the Deoband movement based on the author's PhD research covering the constructive history of the Deoband movement in colonial India, its leading ulama especially Ashraf Ali Thanwi, its relationship with Sufism and its worldwide expansion.

Content 
Ingram's book contains many fresh and important elements based on the work of Barbara D. Metcalf, Muhammad Qasim Zaman and others. The book asks how the Deobandi tradition was created, transmitted and globalized and competed. The author himself has tried to dispel the misconception by providing a textured description that the Deobandis are anti-Sufi. Extensive use of Urdu sources is observed in the book. Another important topic of the book is Deobandi movement in South Africa. The content of this book is arranged in 8 chapters in total.

See also 
Islamic Revival in British India: Deoband, 1860-1900
The Deoband School And The Demand For Pakistan

References

External links 

 

 
2018 non-fiction books
American books
Deobandi literature
English-language books
History of Islam
Works about Darul Uloom Deoband
University of California Press books